The Sri Lanka lowland rain forests represents Sri Lanka's Tropical rainforests below  in elevation in the southwestern part of the island. The year-around warm, wet climate together with thousands years of isolation from mainland India have resulted in the evolution of numerous plants and animal species that can only  be found in rain forests in Sri Lanka. The lowland rain forests accounts for 2.14 percent of Sri Lanka's land area. This ecoregion is the home of the jungle shrew, a small endemic mammal of Sri Lanka. Sri Lanka has the highest density of amphibian species worldwide. Many of these, including 250 species of tree frogs, live in these rain forests.

Forest cover
The lowland rain forests cover  in total and accounts for 2.14 percent of Sri Lanka's land area. Wet monsoon forests receive  of annual rainfall and are situated belove  of altitude. Kanneliya, Viharakele, Nakiyadeniya, and Sinharaja, which is a World Heritage Site, are the forests that represent this ecoregion. Bambarabotuwa, Morapitiya Runakanda, Gilimale and Eratne are some of the other forest reserves. Even rainfall throughout the year, and invariable temperature resulted in rich biodiversity. These forests also act as an important catchment area for rivers.

Geological history
Sri Lanka is a continental island, separated from the Asian continent only by shallow Palk Strait. Sri Lanka was once a part of Gondwanaland, until the Cretaceous Period. Then as a part of the Indian Plate, it detached and drifted northward. The Indian Plate collided with the Asian mainland about 55 million years later. Therefore, there are many ancient Gondwana taxonomic groups present in Sri Lanka. Sri Lanka first became separated from the mainland Indian subcontinent during the late Miocene Epoch. Due to climatic changes, an intermittent drier region emerged between the moist forests in southwest Sri Lanka and the Western Ghats in India, the closest other moist forests. Although the island has been connected with the mainland repeatedly by land bridges since the initial separation, Sri Lanka's moist forests and its wet forest-adapted biota have been identified as being ecologically isolated.

Features
The ecoregion partially encircles the Central Massif, which reach above  and detached  Knuckles Mountain Range. These mountains are represented by their own ecoregion, Sri Lanka montane rain forests. The type of the soil of the ecoregion is red-yellow podzolic soil. The temperature remains constantly between  throughout the year. Due to the proximity to the Indian Ocean daily temperatures are relieved by the ocean breezes. Relative humidity ranges between 75%-85%.

Flora
The vegetation of the region is determined primarily by climate, with topography and edaphic conditions contributing secondarily. Two floral communities dominate in the Sri Lankan lowland rain forests - the Dipterocarpus-dominated (Sinhalese "Hora") community and the Mesua-Shorea community (Sinhalese "Na-Doona"). The Dipterocarpus community comprises Dipterocarpus zeylanicus, Dipterocarpus hispidus, Vitex altissima, Chaetocarpus castanocarpus, Dillenia retusa, Dillenia triquetra, Myristica dactyloides, and Semecarpus gardneri. The Mesua-Shorea community comprises Anisophyllea cinnamomoides, Cullenia rosayroana, Mesua ferrea (the national tree of Sri Lanka), Mesua nagassarium, Myristica dactyloides, Palaquium petiolare, Shorea affinis, Shorea congestiflora, Shorea disticha, Shorea megistophylla, Shorea trapezifolia, Shorea worthingtoni, Syzygium rubicundum, and a sub canopy of Chaetocarpus castanocarpus, Garcinia hermonii, Syzygium neesianum, and Xylopia championi.

Swamp forests situated closer to the coastlines are a distinct habit area within the ecoregion. Avicennia-Rhizophora-Sonneratia dominated mangroves fringe the coastlines.

Biodiversity
Almost all the endemic flora and fauna of Sri Lanka are confined to the southwestern rain forests. Due to the warm and moist climate and long physical isolation, wet forest adopted species have promoted a high degree of endemism and specialization. More than 60 percent of 306 endemic tree species of Sri Lanka are restricted to this ecoregion. A further 61 species are shared with the montane rain forests and dry forests. The dominant tree family in Asian rain forests, the family Dipterocarpaceae shows a special endemicity. All but one species of the 58 species of the family Dipterocarpaceae can only be found in these rain forests, including two endemic genera, Shorea and Stemonoporus. Anoectochilus setaceus or Wanaraja (Sinhalese for "King of forest"), an endemic orchid, is only found in undisturbed forests of this ecoregion. Several plant species show highly localized distribution. The lowland and sub montane forests are the floristically richest in Sri Lanka and of all South Asia.

Fauna

Mammals
Sri Lanka lacks the land area to support large animals. Although fossil records of ancestral forms of rhinoceroses, hippopotamuses, and lions have been found. Despite the small number of species, this ecoregion is home to several near-endemic mammals, including one strict endemic species, the jungle shrew. The two endemic shrews, the Asian highland shrew and the jungle shrew are listed as vulnerable and endangered respectively. The Sri Lanka leopard, the largest carnivore of the island, is identified as threatened. Asian elephants live in small numbers in these rain forests and are listed as endangered. Unlike in dry-zone forests, where they live in large numbers, this ecoregion's elephant population is faced with habitat loss and fragmentation. The Indian hare, fishing cat and rusty-spotted cat are some of the other mammals who dwell in this ecoregion.

The near-endemic and strict endemic mammals live in the areas listed below. Strict endemic species are marked with an asterisk.

Asian highland shrew
Jungle shrew*
Thailand roundleaf bat
Purple-faced langur
Golden palm civet
Layard's palm squirrel
Travancore flying squirrel
Ceylon spiny mouse
Nolthenius's long-tailed climbing mouse

Birds
This ecoregion is completely contained within the Endemic bird area of Sri Lanka. Out of sixteen bird species categorized as near-endemic, two species, the green-billed coucal and the white-throated flowerpecker are indigenous. The green-billed coucal and the Sri Lanka whistling-thrush are listed as threatened. The ashy-headed laughingthrush, red-faced malkoha and scaly thrush are the other threatened species.

The near-endemic and strict endemic birds live in the areas listed below. Strict endemic species are marked with an asterisk.

Sri Lanka wood pigeon
Sri Lanka grey hornbill
Red-faced malkoha
Green-billed coucal*
Sri Lanka spurfowl
Sri Lanka junglefowl
Sri Lanka blue magpie
Spot-winged thrush
White-faced starling
Sri Lanka myna
Kashmir flycatcher
Brown-capped babbler
Orange-billed babbler
White-throated flowerpecker*
Yellow-fronted barbet
Sri Lanka hanging parrot
Layard's parakeet
Chestnut-backed owlet

Reptiles, fishes and amphibians
Sri Lanka's reptile fauna includes 204 species with 114 endemic species. A further 17 taxa are endemic at subspecies level. The mugger crocodile and the spineless forest lizard are listed as endangered along with eight freshwater fish species. Sri Lanka has the highest density of amphibian species worldwide (3.9 species per ). These include 250 species of frogs belonging to the family Rhacophoridae. These species are also faced with habitat fragmentation and loss.

Threats and conservation
Most of the Sri Lanka's rain forests were cleared for plantations, originally for coffee and cinchona and then tea and rubber. The remaining forests cover only 4.6 percent of the wet zone. Between 1990 and 2005, Sri Lanka has showed one of the highest deforestation rates of primary forests in the world. 
A survey carried out in 2005 found that 17 of Sri Lanka's frogs have become extinct in the past decade and another 11 species face imminent threat of extinction unless their habitat is secured. These remaining forests exist as highly fragmented patches. Poaching and the extraction of forest products (timber, firewood, medicinal plants) are a problem in almost all forest reserves.

Nevertheless, if the existing forests are preserved the condition can be improved, as many of the species of this ecoregion have small habitat needs. There are several protected areas that overlap with the ecoregion. The two most notable are the world heritage site the Sinharaja Forest Reserve and the Peak Wilderness Sanctuary. Altogether, protected areas of this ecoregion accounts for only .

Protected areas that overlap with the ecoregion:

References

 
Ecoregions of Sri Lanka
 
Forests of Sri Lanka
Indomalayan ecoregions
Tropical and subtropical moist broadleaf forests